Farzad "Freddy" Rouhani (born 1963 or 1964) is an American professional poker player who won the 2008 World Series of Poker $2,500 Omaha/Seven Card Stud Hi-Low-8 or Better event.

Rouhani, who was born in Iran, came to the United States in 1985 to attend medical school, but became a professional poker player instead. He currently resides in Germantown, Maryland.

World Series of Poker 
Rouhani has seven cashes at the World Series of Poker (WSOP), His largest cash was when he finished runner-up to Justin Scott in the $2,000 No Limit Hold'em event at the 2006 World Series of Poker, earning $429,065. His highest finish at the Main Event was 293rd place at the 2005 World Series of Poker, earning $24,365. At the 2008 World Series of Poker, he won his first bracelet in the $2,500 Omaha/Seven Card Stud Hi-Low-8 or Better event, earning $232,911.

World Series of Poker bracelets 

As of 2009, his total live tournament winnings exceed $1,600,000. His 13 cashes at the WSOP account for $1,328,985 of those winnings.

References

External links 
 PokerListings – Farzad Rouhani Splits The Field – Interview
 ESPN Poker Club – Another event, another win for the pros

1960s births
American poker players
Iranian poker players
Living people
World Series of Poker bracelet winners
People from Germantown, Maryland